Donald Arthur Tunbridge (28 October 1920 – March 1999) was a British racewalker. He competed in the men's 50 kilometres walk at the 1952 Summer Olympics.

References

1920 births
1999 deaths
Athletes (track and field) at the 1952 Summer Olympics
British male racewalkers
Olympic athletes of Great Britain
Place of birth missing